Hisonotus iota is a species of catfish in the family Loricariidae. It is native to South America, where it occurs in the Chapecó River, which is a tributary of the Uruguay River. The species reaches 3.3 cm (1.3 inches) SL.

Hisonotus iota was described in 2009 by Tiago P. Carvalho (of the Pontifical Xavierian University) and Roberto E. Reis (of the Pontifical Catholic University of Rio Grande do Sul) alongside three other Hisonotus species from the Uruguay River basin: H. montanus, H. megaloplax, and H. leucophrys. The type locality of H. iota is stated to be the Chapecó River near the road between Coronel Freitas and Quilombo in the Brazilian state of Santa Catarina.

References 

Otothyrinae
Taxa described in 2009
Catfish of South America
Fish of Brazil